Danny A. Ledonne (born January 18, 1982) is an American film director and former video game developer. From 2011 to 2014, he worked as a professor in Film and Media Arts at American University, served on the board of the Southern Colorado Film Commission, and became the director for the 2015 edition of the festival. He is known for the documentary Playing Columbine, about the controversy surrounding his 2005 video game Super Columbine Massacre RPG!.

Early life

Ledonne attended the Alamosa High School in Colorado. He graduated from school with a 4.0 grade point average and was voted "most likely to succeed" by his peers. He went on to study film at Emerson College in Boston, Massachusetts. It was during his time at college that he discovered a program called RPG Maker, which allowed a developer to create and design their own games for the PC.

In 2005 he released his first and to date only video game, called Super Columbine Massacre RPG!, that replayed the events of the Columbine High School massacre. Ledonne created the game to explore what caused the gunmen to commit the atrocity and to dispel the myths that violent video games had played a role in the massacre. Upon its release, the game was met with heavy criticism from the public and the mainstream media over the subject matter of the RPG, and even led PC World to declare the game #2 on its list of "The 10 Worst Games of All Time."

Ledonne defended the game despite its negative reaction, saying that the story of the attackers resonated with his own experience at school.

Since the game's release, Ledonne has become an unwitting champion for video games, despite Super Columbine Massacre being the only game he ever created.

Film career

Upon graduating from college, Ledonne worked on narrative and documentary short films such as Solace, The Unbelievable Truth, The Good Life, Super 7, and Wild Animals, Domesticated Humans (which he wrote and directed). In 2002, he produced and directed a Brickfilm animated adaptation of "Ship of Fools", a cautionary parable of industrial society written from prison by Ted Kaczynski.

In 2007, he produced and edited the full-length documentary Playing Columbine. The film features over fifty interviews with game industry leaders, theorists, and developers, authors, filmmakers, journalists, elected officials, school shooting survivors, concerned citizens, festival organizers, media activists, free speech loyalists, and video game players. The film chronicles the controversy surrounding Super Columbine Massacre RPG!.  It also features numerous other independent games, and film examines the video game/real world violence debate as well as exploring the future of interactive media's potential to confront serious issues.

The film features notable figures including Jack Thompson, Hal Halpin, Doug Lowenstein, Jason Della Rocca, Jenova Chen, Brian Flemming, and the hosts of Free Talk Live.  It was screened at film festivals such as the Denver Film Festival and AFI Fest.

In 2011, Ledonne released his second documentary, Duck! (A Documentary), which explores the different species and natures of ducks across North America.

Teaching career and Adams State lawsuit

In May 2011, Ledonne became a part-time film instructor at the Adams State University in Alamosa, Colorado. He taught three courses per semester under the mass communication program and carried out video production services on behalf of the university. He also served on the board of the Southern Colorado Film Commission for a number of years, and became the festival's director in 2015. Ledonne was later made a full-time visiting professor, with full benefits.

During the latter months of his final contract with the university, Ledonne established the website Watching Adams, a blog that discussed and often criticized the institution's administrators. In many of his posts, Ledonne brought light to a situation regarding significant differences in the pay structure between administrative and academic staff. In some cases, it was demonstrated that athletic and administrative staff made 120 percent or more of industry benchmarks, and that academic faculty made 80 percent or less.

Within two days of the post regarding the pay structure, University President Beverlee McClure issued Ledonne with a "No Trespass Order" of the university campus and its buildings, on the grounds that his behavior was deemed to be disruptive, detrimental and posed a safety risk to the university. The university labelled Ledonne as a "terrorist" and said that any attempt to enter the campus would result in being arrested. The ban also prohibited Ledonne from attending the 2015 edition of the Southern Colorado Film Festival, of which he was the president; he was therefore forced to resign from his post.

In February 2016, the ACLU launched a legal bid to reverse the ban on the grounds that the university had no legitimate basis for banning Ledonne and that the action had been defamatory to his character as there was no evidence that he had ever engaged in any threats of violence, direct or indirect, toward anyone or anything at the university. The action was intended to vindicate Ledonne's First Amendment right to criticize the operations of the university. Both parties eventually entered into mediation before a former federal judge. This resulted in a settlement agreement in which Adams State University would repeal the ban and pay $100,000 in compensation for the ordeal.

Speaking about the settlement, Ledonne said via a statement from the ACLU:

Campaign work

In 2013, Ledonne helped found the Keep Polston Public group in Alamosa, Colorado. The group was formed in opposition to the handover of the derelict site of the former Polston Elementary School to a private enterprise, which planned to transform the area into an RV resort and demolish the community garden that had occupied the site during the school's operational years in the late 1990s and after its closure. As the only Alamosa native in the KPP and a former pupil of the school, Ledonne played a crucial role in the organization. He helped the group work with legal consultants to challenge the school's decision, citing that it may have been illegal on several counts. After the challenge failed, the group filed a lawsuit alleging that the school board had violated Colorado Open Meeting Law, the state's constitution and the Colorado Public Schools Act procedure for sale of real estate. In 2014, the group agreed to drop the lawsuit in exchange for the chance to buy the property for $900,000. The full sum was successfully raised and the property was purchased by the Trust for Public Land. It is now owned outright by the San Luis Valley Local Foods Coalition.

Awards

Personal life

Ledonne holds a Master of Fine Arts in Film & Electronic Media from American University in Washington, D.C.

He has a black belt in Taekwondo.

References

External links
 Emberwilde Productions official website
 
 Official homepage of Playing Columbine (documentary)
 Playing Columbine review in Variety
 New York Times story on Ledonne and SCMRPG
 Danny Ledonne on Free Talk Live radio

Interviews
 Interview published 2006-05-24 on kotaku.com
 Interview published 2006-09-20 on kotaku.com
 Interview published 2007-01-11 on Arthouse Games
 Interview published 2007-11-28 in the Montreal Mirror
 Interview published 2017-12-23 by The Curator's Corner on YouTube

1982 births
Living people
Emerson College alumni
American University School of Communication alumni
People from Alamosa, Colorado
Video game developers
American atheists
American documentary film directors
Film directors from Colorado